Agustín de Iturbide y Green (2 April 1863 – 3 March 1925) was the grandson of Agustín de Iturbide, the first emperor of independent Mexico, and his consort Ana María Huarte. 

He became the adopted son with the title of Prince of Iturbide, along with his cousin Salvador de Itúrbide y de Marzán, of Mexico's only other royal heads of state, Emperor Maximilian I of Mexico and Empress Carlota of Mexico. , but he had no children. His claims passed to Maria Josepha Sophia de Iturbide, the daughter of his cousin, Salvador.

Family
Iturbide was the son of Emperor Agustin's second son, Prince Don Ángel María de Iturbide y Huarte (2 October 1816 – 21 July 1872). His mother was Alice Green (c. 1836–1892), daughter of Captain John Nathaniel Green, granddaughter of United States congressman and Revolutionary War General Uriah Forrest, and great-granddaughter of George Plater, Governor of Maryland.

Possible Mexican royal heir

When Maximilian and Carlota ascended the throne of Mexico in 1863 with the support of the French troops of Napoleon III, the childless new monarchs invited the Iturbide family back to Mexico. As it was clear several years into their marriage that Maximilian and Carlota could have no children together, they offered to adopt Iturbide, which was agreed to with enthusiasm by his father and reluctance by his mother. Iturbide and his cousin were granted the vitalicio (meaning non-hereditary) title of Prince de Iturbide and style of Highness by imperial decree of 16 September 1865 and were ranked after the reigning family. Apparently, the royal couple intended to groom Agustín as heir to the throne. Maximilian never really intended to give the crown to the Iturbides because he believed that they were not of royal blood. It was all a charade directed at his younger brother Archduke Karl Ludwig of Austria, as Maximilian explained himself: either Karl would give him one of his sons as an heir, or else he would bequeath everything to the Iturbide children.

Post-monarchy
With the overthrow of the second Mexican Empire in 1867, Iturbide's biological parents took him first to England and then back to the United States, where they settled in Washington, DC. When he came of age, Iturbide, who had graduated from Georgetown University, renounced his claim to the throne and title and returned to Mexico. He then served as an officer in the Mexican army. But in 1890, after publishing articles critical of President Porfirio Díaz, he was arrested on charges of sedition and sentenced to fourteen months of imprisonment.  After release from prison, Iturbide was sent into exile, where he suffered two severe nervous breakdowns that resulted in his believing that he would be assassinated. Eventually, he returned to Georgetown University, as a professor of the Spanish and French languages.

For some years before his marriage, Iturbide lived at a monastery near Washington, DC, where he worked as a translator.

Marriage
In 1894, he married Lucy Eleanor Jackson (1 January 1862 – 11 May 1940), daughter of the Rev. William Jackson, by his wife Lucy Catherine Hatchett, of Yealmpton, Devon, United Kingdom. She died in Epsom, Surrey, United Kingdom.

On 5 July 1915, he married Mary Louise Kearney (25 September 1872 – September 1967), a D.C.-born granddaughter of Brigadier General James Kearney of the United States Army.

Death
Agustín de Iturbide y Green died on 3 March 1925 in Washington, D.C. after suffering a serious nervous and physical breakdown. He was buried at the Church of St John the Evangelist, in Philadelphia, Pennsylvania — alongside his paternal grandmother, Empress Ana María of Mexico.

In popular culture
Mickey Kuhn portrayed De Iturbide y Green in Juarez (1939).

References

External links
Imperial House of Mexico

Agustin de Iturbide y Green's Family Tree

Agustin
Mexican princes
Agustin
Pretenders to the Mexican throne
Heirs apparent who never acceded
1863 births
1925 deaths
19th-century Mexican people
People from Mexico City
Mexican people of American descent
Mexican people of Basque descent
Georgetown University alumni
Independent Mexico
Philodemic Society members
Child pretenders
Nobility of the Americas